Charles Allen Wehan (born October 31, 1998) is an American soccer player who plays as a forward.

Career

Youth
Wehan played high school soccer at Aliso Niguel High School, where in his freshman season he was named as first team All-CIF and first team all-conference. Wehan also played club soccer with USSDA side Strikers FC between 2014 and 2017. In 2016–17, he was tied for ninth nationally with 21 goals in 34 appearances.

College 
In 2017, Wehan attended Stanford University to play college soccer. Over four seasons with the Cardinal, When made 72 appearances, scoring 10 goals and tallying 18 assists, which included only 34 starting appearances. He also earned numerous awards and accolades over his college career, including Pac-12 All-Academic Honorable Mention in 2018, a two-time Pac-12 Academic Honor Roll, a three-time All-Pac-12, and was United Soccer Coaches All-Far West Region Second Team in 2020. He was part of the Cardinal team that won the Pac-12 championship three times and was the NCAA champion in 2017.

Professional 
On June 16, 2021, Wehan signed with USL Championship side Real Monarchs. He debuted for the club two days later, starting in a 2–1 loss to El Paso Locomotive.

Honors

College
Stanford Cardinals
 NCAA Division I Men's Soccer Championship: 2017
 Pac-12 Conference: 2017, 2018, 2020

Personal
Charlie's brother, Chris, is also a professional soccer player.

References

External links 
 Real Salt Lake Charlie Wehan | Real Salt Lake

1998 births
Aliso Niguel High School alumni
American soccer players
Association football forwards
Living people
People from Laguna Niguel, California
Real Monarchs players
Soccer players from California
Sportspeople from Orange County, California
Stanford Cardinal men's soccer players
USL Championship players